Sliver may refer to:

Entertainment
Sliver (novel), a 1991 novel by Ira Levin
Sliver (film), a 1993 film adaptation of the novel
Sliver (soundtrack), the soundtrack to the 1993 film
"Sliver" (song), a 1990 song by Nirvana
Sliver: The Best of the Box, a 2005 album containing tracks from the Nirvana rarities collection With The Lights Out
Sliver (EP), a 2000 EP by Entwine
Sliver, a slur used by the Mirror Police in Infinity Train to refer to renegade reflections such as MT (Mirror Tulip) / Lake
Sliver, a fictional species in Magic: The Gathering

Other uses
Sliver building, a tall slender building
Sliver (textiles), a form of fiber prepared for spinning
Splinter, a sliver of wood that penetrates the skin
Sliver polygon, a small unwanted polygon resulting from layer intersection in GIS

See also
Motorola SLVR L7, a mobile phone made by Motorola
Silver (disambiguation)